Nogometni Klub Orkan Dugi Rat (Football Club Orkan Dugi Rat), commonly referred to as Orkan is a Croatian football club based in the town of Dugi Rat, in the southern Croatian region of Dalmatia. They currently compete in Prva Županijska Liga – South, Croatian fourth level. Orkan play their home matches at the 3,000-capacity ŠRC Dalmacija, built in 1978. Orkan has produced many players who went on to have successful careers including Tomislav Erceg, Tonči Gabrić, and Tonči Žilić. Antun Lokošek coached the club in the Yugoslav period.

References 

Association football clubs established in 1918
Orkan Dugi Rat
Orkan Dugi Rat
1918 establishments in Croatia

External links 
 NK Orkan
 Orkan kroz povijest